John Kent (1805 – 1 September 1872) arrived in Newfoundland in 1820 and started working for his uncle, Patrick Morris, a successful businessman and entrepreneur.

He was elected to the first House of Assembly in 1832 as a Liberal. Kent was a champion of Catholic rights on an island that was then deeply divided along religious lines, which his actions directly exacerbated. He was described in the Dictionary of Canadian Biography (DCB) as a demagogue who "enjoyed the storm and rode it to his own advantage", a style of politicking later followed in similar fashion by, among others, Edward Murphy Jr. (of Troy, New York) and Richard J. Daley (of Chicago). The DCB states, "Kent's electioneering was a compound of his own strident vitality, intimidation, and clerical influence. Newfoundland in 1832 had virtually universal suffrage under a household franchise, and it was not difficult to secure election by turbulent, and very effective means. Kent was of the school of Reformers who relished quarrels with authority."

He worked for the reform movement along with his uncle, Philip Morris, and William Carson, which successfully persuaded the British Colonial Office to institute responsible government in Newfoundland. Kent became Colonial Secretary under Philip Francis Little.

From 1848-55 he was Speaker of the Newfoundland House of Assembly. He became Premier after Little resigned in 1858. He won the election of 1859 but his government was engulfed by crisis in  1861 when it tried to lower the salary of government officials, including judges who sued the government.

In the legislature, Kent accused Governor Sir Alexander Bannerman and the opposition Conservatives of conspiring with the judges against the government. Bannerman, who despised Kent's "dictatorial methods and disliked his administration", responded by dismissing Kent's government in March 1861, which Kent described as a "gross act of treachery".

The Liberals defeated the Conservative government in a Motion of No Confidence. The Conservatives narrowly defeated Kent's Liberals in a sometimes violent election campaign fought along sectarian lines with Catholics largely voting Liberal and Protestants largely voting Conservative. Riots erupted in the heavily Catholic Harbour Grace area when Bannerman cancelled voting there. Later that same year, 1861, Hugh Hoyles was appointed by Bannerman as Conservative Premier of the new government.

Death
Kent died at St John's on 1 September 1872. His wife, a sister of Michael Anthony Fleming, Bishop of Newfoundland, and at least two of their children, survived him.

References

1805 births
1872 deaths
Irish emigrants to pre-Confederation Newfoundland
Canadian Roman Catholics
Premiers of Newfoundland Colony
Politicians from County Waterford
Speakers of the Newfoundland and Labrador House of Assembly
Colonial Secretaries of Newfoundland